Mkhitar Hayrapetyan (born May 15, 1990) is a Member of Armenian National Assembly from My Step Alliance,  member of the Civil Contract party, former Minister of Diaspora of Armenia (from May 11, 2018 to January 11, 2019), turkologist. On December 9, 2018 Hayrapetyan was elected as a Member of the National Assembly of Armenia from the territorial electoral list of the electoral district #1 of the “My Step” alliance of parties. Since 18 January, 2019 Hayrapetyan is the Chairman of the Standing committee on Science, Education, Culture, Diaspora, Youth and Sport. Also, the Head of Armenian delegation at Euronest Parliamentary Assembly.
Mkhitar Hayrpetyan and Sebastian Kurz were the only ministers in Europe to be assigned to their role at the age of 27.։

Education 
Hayrapetyan graduated from number 127 school in Yerevan and entered the Department of Oriental Studies (Turkish) of YSU in 2007. He completed his Master's Degree in 2013. From 2012 to 2013 he was a member of the Student Scientific Society and Student Council of YSU Department of Oriental Studies. Author of several scientific articles.

Career 
In 2011 he founded the Young Politicians Association and, as of April 2015, he was the vice president of the organization. In January 2016 he became the founding president of the Civic Education and Youth Development Center. In 2010–2017 in parallel with public-political activities he worked for several local newspapers as expert on the Middle East and particularly on Turkey.

Political career 
Mkhitar Hayrapetyan is one of the founding members of the Civil Contract Party. In December 2016 he was elected chairman of the Nor-Nork regional organization of Civil Contract, simultaneously being included in the political council of the party. From 2016 to 2018 he was the party's Coordinator on Diaspora Affairs.

On December 9, 2018 Hayrapetyan was elected Member of the National Assembly from the territorial electoral list of the electoral district #1 of the “My Step” alliance of parties. 
Since 18 January, 2019 Chairman of the Standing committee on Science, Education, Culture, Diaspora, Youth and Sport.
Head of Armenian delegation at Euronest Parliamentary Assembly.

Minister of Diaspora 
On May 11, 2018 Armen Sargsyan, the Armenian President, appointed Hayrapetyan as Minister of Diaspora on the recommendation of Prime Minister Nikol Pashinyan, by the 150th paragraph of the Constitution. 

Hayrapetyan initiated the reorganization of "Come home" program and exclusion of previous abuses.

During his official visits to Cyprus and USA he met the President of Cyprus and representatives of Armenian communities, and other high-ranking officials of these countries, and embarked on deepening further cooperation and implementation of new programs.

On September 24-27, the delegation headed by the Minister of Diaspora Mkhitar Hayrapetyan, had a working visit to Cyprus. In the frames of the official visit he had a meeting with the president of the Republic of Cyprus Nicos Anastasiades.

On July 27 to August 7 Mkhitar Hayrapetyan had a working visit to the United States of America. He visited Los Angeles, New York and Boston. He had meetings with a number of politicians and the Armenian community.

On September 20-22, the delegation headed by the Minister of Diaspora Mkhitar Hayrapetyan, had a working visit to Syrian Arab Republic. It should be highlighted that since 2011 when the Syrian war started, Mkhitar Hayrapetyan is the first official representative of Armenia who visited Aleppo.

On September 20-22, the delegation headed by the Minister of Diaspora Mkhitar Hayrapetyan, had a working visit to the Lebanese Republic. The minister of Diaspora Mkhitar Hayrapetyan visited Anjar, afterwards Beirut. He had meetings with Catholicos of the Great House of Cilicia, Aram I and the Armenian community.

On September 24-27, Mkhitar Hayrapetyan visited the Arab Republic of Egypt, where he had meetings with the representatives of the Armenian community and the Prime Minister of Egypt.

It should be highlighted that since 2011 when the Syrian war started, Mkhitar Hayrapetyan is the first official representative of Armenia who visited Aleppo.

References

External links 

 Mkhitar Hayrapetyan's official facebook page

1990 births
Politicians from Yerevan
Government ministers of Armenia
Diaspora ministers of Armenia
Living people
Yerevan State University alumni
21st-century Armenian politicians